St. Olave's Church or St. Olav's Church, or variants thereof, refers to churches dedicated to Olaf II of Norway, and may refer to:

England 
 St Olav's Norwegian Seamen's Church, London, the English name for Sjømannskirken, London
 St Olave's Church, Chester, Cheshire
 St Olave's Church, Gatcombe, Isle of Wight
 St Olave's Church, Hart Street, London
 St Olave's Church, Old Jewry, London
 St Olave's Church, Silver Street, London
 St Olave's Church, Southwark, London
 St Olave's Church, York, Yorkshire
 St Nicholas Olave, London

Norway 
 St. Olav's Church of Avaldsnes, the formal name for Avaldsnes Church
 St. Olav's Church (ruin) in Bamble, Telemark
 St. Olav's Church, Bergen, incorporated into the current Bergen Cathedral
 St. Olav's Cathedral, Oslo
 St. Olav's Cathedral, Trondheim

See also 
 St. Olaf's Church